Slavchev, female form Slavcheva, is a Bulgarian surname.

Notable people with this surname include:
Anton Slavchev, Bulgarian footballer
Evladiya Slavcheva-Stefanova, Bulgarian basketball player
Georgi Slavchev, Bulgarian footballer
Gergana Slavcheva, Bulgarian basketball player
Ivo Slavchev, Bulgarian footballer
Simeon Slavchev, Bulgarian footballer
Slavin Slavchev, Bulgarian singer/songwriter
Svetoslav Slavchev, Bulgarian writer

Bulgarian-language surnames